Nationality words link to articles with information on the nation's poetry or literature (for instance, Irish or France).

Events
 Clément Marot presents Francis I of France his Judgment of Minos; appointed facteur de la reine ("queen's poet") to Queen Claude

Works published
 Francesco Maria Molzo, The Aeneid translation from the Latin of Virgil into Italian, in consecutive unrhymed verse (forerunner of blank verse)

Births
Death years link to the corresponding "[year] in poetry" article:
 Giorgio Cichino (died 1599), Italian, Latin-language poet
 Charles Fontaine (died 1588), French

Deaths
Birth years link to the corresponding "[year] in poetry" article:
 Suster Bertken (born 1426 or 1427), Dutch
 Benedetto Cariteo (born 1450), Italian

See also

 Poetry
 16th century in poetry
 16th century in literature
 French Renaissance literature
 Grands Rhétoriqueurs
 Renaissance literature
 Spanish Renaissance literature

Notes

16th-century poetry
Poetry